Indigofera szechuensis (syn. Indigofera potaninii) is a species of flowering plant in the family Fabaceae, native to Tibet and central China. It is a non-climbing shrub reaching .

It is the namesake of a species complex that also includes Indigofera calcicola, I.delavayi, I.franchetii, I.hancockii, I.lenticellata, I.pendula, and I.rigioclada. Most of what is cultivated in the United Kingdom as Indigofera potaninii is actually Indigofera howellii.

References

szechuensis
Endemic flora of China
Flora of Tibet
Flora of North-Central China
Flora of South-Central China
Plants described in 1913
Taxa named by William Grant Craib